Peter Grathwohl (born 1958) is a German geologist and expert in hydrology and environmental processes. 1996 he was appointed a full professor of hydrogeochemistry at the University of Tübingen, Germany. Since 2014, he has been vice-president of research of the University of Tübingen.

Life
Grathwohl was born in Sigmaringen, Germany. He studied Geology at the University of Tübingen. After his diploma 1985 he finished his doctorate in 1988. 1989-1990 he worked as a postdoctoral researcher at Stanford University. 1990 he returned to Germany and built up a research group and laboratories for geochemistry at the Center of Applied Geosciences, Tübingen University. In 1996 he was appointed to the rank of a full professor of hydrogeochemistry. 1997-2000 he served as secretary of the section “hydrology and chemical processes” of the European Geophysical Union. 1997-2003 he was member of the scientific advisory committee for soil protection of the Federal Government of Germany and since 2005 he has been in the soil protection commission of the German Federal Environmental Protection Agency.
2006-2010 Grathwohl served as dean of the geoscience faculty of Tübingen University; 2010-2014 he was vice-dean of the new-created faculty of sciences. Since 2014 he has been vice-president of research of Tübingen University. 2015 he was elected as a member of the senate of the German Research Foundation (DFG). 2006-2010 he chaired the section of hydrogeology of the German Geological Society. 2000-2010 he was chair of the standardization committee "Leaching Tests" in the Deutsches Institut für Normung (German Institute for Standardization, DIN, NAW).

Research
Grathwohl´s research interests focus on fate and transport of persistent organic pollutants in water, air, soils, and sediments. In applied geosciences he worked on contaminated site assessment and groundwater remediation techniques and developed standards for aqueous leaching of waste materials and the monitoring of atmospheric deposition of persistent organic pollutants. In his career, he managed numerous national and international joint research projects funded by the European Union, the German Federal Government and the German Research Foundation.

Awards
Karl Heinrich Heitfeld Prize for Applied Geosciences, 2004

Publications
Liu, Y., Beckingham, B., Rügner, H., Li, Z., Ma, L., Schwientek, M., Xie, H., Zhao, J., Grathwohl, P. (2013): Comparison of sedimentary PAHs in the Rivers of Ammer (Germany) and Liangtan (China): Differences between early- and newly industrialized countries. Environ. Sci. Technol., 47, 701-709
Grathwohl, P., Susset, B. (2009): Comparison of percolation to batch and sequential leaching tests: Theory and data.  Waste Management, 29, 2681-2689
Gocht, T., Klemm, O., Grathwohl, P. (2007): Long-term atmospheric bulk deposition of polycyclic aromatic hydrocarbons (PAHs) in rural areas of Southern Germany. Atmospheric Environment, 41, 1315–1327
Werth, C. J., Cirpka, O. A., Grathwohl, P. (2006): Enhanced mixing and reaction through flow focusing in heterogeneous porous media. Water Resources Research, 42, W12414, 
Boving, T, Grathwohl, P. (2001): Matrix diffusion coefficients in sandstones and limestones: Relationship to permeability and porosity. J. Cont. Hydrol., 53, 85-100
Kleineidam, S., Rügner, H., Ligouis, B., Grathwohl, P. (1999): Organic matter facies and equilibrium sorption of phenanthrene. Environ. Sci. Tech., 33, 10, 1637-1644.
Grathwohl, P., Reinhard, M. (1993): Desorption of Trichloroethylene in aquifer material: Rate limitation at the grain scale. Environ. Sci. Technol., 27, 12, 2360-2366.
Grathwohl, P. (1990): Influence of organic matter from soils and sediments from various origins on the sorption of some chlorinated aliphatic hydrocarbons: Implications on Koc-correlations. Environ. Sci. Technol., 24, 11, 1687-1693.

References

External links

1958 births
Living people
University of Tübingen alumni
20th-century German geologists
Academic staff of the University of Tübingen
21st-century German geologists